Soulfire is the second album by the Christian Reggae group Christafari, their first released on the Gotee label.

Track listing
"Listening" - 4:33
"Thanks And Praise (Interlude)" - 0:11
"Selah" - 5:17
"Christafari" - 5:04
"Soulfire" - 4:05
"Inside Burning" - 4:01
"Niyabinghi (Interlude)" - 0:13
"Sitting And Watching (Fly Away)" - 5:16
"Give A Little One Love" - 4:50
"Uhuru (Interlude)" - 0:15
"Come Children" - 5:30
"Spirit Cry" - 4:33
"Dj Intro" - 0:56
"Boomerang" - 3:42
"Wha? (Interlude)" - 0:10
"Crucified" - 5:01

References

1995 albums
Christafari albums
Gotee Records albums